Yatton is a hamlet in the civil parish of Aymestrey in north-western Herefordshire, England. In 1870–72 the township had a population of 214.

It is just off the A4110 road.

History
The hamlet contains some brick-arched barns and old cottages, converted barns and large farmhouses and lies close to Croft Castle and its estate; the Mortimer Trail waymarked walk passes close by. The area was formerly the site of a large stone quarry but the site has been reclaimed, landscaped and replanted. The local schools are Wigmore Primary School and Wigmore High School.

References

External links 

Photos of Yatton and surrounding area on Geograph

Hamlets in Herefordshire